Neighbours is an Australian television soap opera. It was first broadcast on 18 March 1985 and airs on digital channel 10 Peach. The following is a list of characters that first appear in the show in 2022, by order of first appearance. All characters are introduced by the show's executive producer Jason Herbison. The 2022 season of Neighbours began airing from 3 January, following the first Christmas transmission break since 2018, and ran until the series concluded its initial run on 28 July 2022. Zara Selwyn was introduced in the first episode of the season, and Freya Wozniak and Sadie Rodwell made their debuts three weeks later. Kiri Durant made her first appearance in March, while Montana Marcel, Corey Smythe Jones and Harriet Wallace first appeared in April. Asher Nesmith arrived in May. Sian Caton, Alana Greyson, Estelle Petrides, and Sam Young made their debuts in June, while Byron Stone appeared in July.

From 7 January until 26 July, episodes aired on Channel 5 in the UK before their Australian broadcast. Dates below refer to the Australian broadcast, unless otherwise specified.

Zara Selwyn

Zara Selwyn, played by Freya Van Dyke, made her first appearance on 3 January 2022. Van Dyke confirmed her casting via her social media, where she also expressed her excitement at joining the cast. Zara is the teenage daughter of established character Amy Greenwood (Jacinta Stapleton), who has been referred to on-screen since Amy's reintroduction in 2020, along with her two brothers. Zara's introduction was revealed in the trailer that followed the 2021 season finale in December, which shows Zara's arrival disrupting Amy's polyamorous relationship with Ned Willis (Ben Hall) and Levi Canning (Richie Morris). Amy is also heard saying that her daughter needs to be her main priority ahead of the relationship. Van Dyke last appeared on screens as Zara on the final episode of Neighbours, broadcast on 28 July 2022.

Zara walks in on her mother in bed with Ned Willis and Levi Canning, after they have just had a threesome. Amy explains that Ned and Levi slept over after an impromptu party, and Zara demands that she takes her out for breakfast. At The Flamingo Bar, Zara explains that she snuck away from home to hang out with Amy because her family does not understand what it is like to be a girl. Zara meets Amy's friend Toadie Rebecchi (Ryan Moloney) and gives her mother a Christmas present, which she hopes Amy will hand down to her. Toadie tells Zara to put Amy's alcoholic drink down after she begins drinking it. Later, Amy informs Zara that she is in a polyamorous relationship with Ned and Levi. Zara reacts badly to the news, and the following day treats Amy, Ned and Levi with increased hostility. After Amy gives her an ultimatum to get a part-time job while staying in Erinsborough, Zara reluctantly takes up Ned's offer to work at Harold's Cafe, where she meets Hendrix Greyson (Benny Turland) and learns of his past difficulties in bonding with his father and step-mother. Inspired by Hendrix's story, Zara begins to pursue Levi in an attempt to end her mother's relationships. Zara asks Amy to break up with her boyfriends, so they can enjoy time together, but believes Amy has lied to her when she witnesses her hugging Ned and Levi goodbye. Zara then invites herself into Levi's spa, and accuses him of sexual assault in front of Amy. However, when Amy insists on going to the police if her accusation is genuine, Zara admits it is untrue. Zara apologises to Amy and Levi in a bid to avoid repercussions. While Amy is willing to move on, Levi is unable to and breaks up with Amy.

Meanwhile, Zara is angered by Toadie objecting to her self-entitled behaviour at his house, and spikes the non-alcoholic jelly shots intended for Roxy Willis' (Zima Anderson) hen's party with vodka, one of which is eaten by Toadie's daughter, Nell (Scarlett Anderson). Zara again evades any meaningful punishment by asking to move in with Amy permanently. Zara attends her first day at Erinsborough High, where principal Susan Kennedy (Jackie Woodburne) and teacher Jane Harris (Annie Jones) tell Zara not to alter her uniform in future. Jane introduces Zara to fellow students Sadie Rodwell (Emerald Chan) and Aubrey Laing (Etoile Little), who soon ditch her. Zara is later disappointed to learn that her mother has purchased a food truck and, in anger, Zara sets off the school's fire alarms in front of Jane. Hendrix tells her to pull her head in, before she returns and floods the school toilets. Zara admits to Amy that she tried to get kicked out of school to spend more time with her, so Amy offers her a job at her food truck. However, the two argue again when Susan phones Amy and tells her about the flooding incident, resulting in Zara pushing Amy and walking off, unaware that Amy's broken ribs have punctured her lung.

Freya Wozniak

Freya Wozniak, played by Phoebe Roberts, made her first appearance on 25 January 2022 in Australia and on 20 January in the UK. The character and Roberts' casting was announced via the show's social media accounts on 30 October 2021. She began filming her first scenes the previous week, and is the first new addition to the serial's regular cast since Nicolette Stone (Charlotte Chimes) in July 2020. Roberts expressed her delight about joining the cast, saying "Neighbours is such a huge part of the Australian film and TV industry, it's very exciting to be involved in something so iconic that is also so loved in the UK. As a kid, I tuned in to watch all the drama of Erinsborough unfold, it's surreal to now be a part of that drama!" Roberts' casting occurred shortly after she appeared in Lie With Me, created by Neighbours executive producer Jason Herbison. He stated that the scriptwriters had "created a fascinating character for her that is complex, mysterious and a risk taker, she's going to be a lot of fun and Phoebe has already nailed the role." Her character was also billed as "the ultimate mystery girl" and someone who will "bend the rules" if necessary. Susannah Alexander of Digital Spy observed that while Freya does not share a surname with any of the current characters, there was still a possibility that she has a connection to them or a past character. In a promotional trailer for the show's 2022 episodes, Freya is shown to be a potential love interest for Levi Canning (Richie Morris). Levi first encounters Freya in the aftermath of a fatal weather event at The Flamingo Bar. Freya's last appearance is on 28 July 2022 during the serial's finale.

Levi Canning encounters Freya breaching the security tape around the wreckage of The Flamingo Bar, which is the site of a police investigation following the storm that resulted in the death of Britney Barnes (Montana Cox). Freya removes a scarf from the bar, and Levi pursues her and demands its return. Freya insists the scarf is hers, but refuses to provide her details for it to be returned. Later, she asks Nicolette Stone about Britney before Sheila Canning (Colette Mann) tells her more about Levi. After leaving Sheila and Levi, she looks at a picture of an unknown man on her phone. Sheila sets Freya and Levi up on a date and they go Baker's Hill Winery. During their date, Freya asks to see photos from Levi's cousin's wedding and she notices Ned Willis (Ben Hall) wearing the scarf she picked up. Freya asks Ned if the scarf is his and he explains he picked it up while drunk. Freya then proceeds to ask Ned if he knows the unknown man in the photo, who she says is her cousin.

Sadie Rodwell

Sadie Rodwell, played by Emerald Chan, made her first appearance on 27 January 2022. Chan's casting details were announced on 18 January 2022. Sadie is introduced alongside mean girl Aubrey Laing (Etoile Little) in a storyline that sees Zara Selwyn (Freya Van Dyke) being bullied at school. Sadie is the daughter of the preintroduced Andrew Rodwell (David Lamb; Lloyd Will) and Wendy Rodwell (Candice Leask). Neighbours executive producer, Jason Herbison, teased, "We also have a new family moving into the street." This led to fan speculation that Sadie, Andrew and Wendy could be promoted to regular characters and it was later revealed on screen that they would be moving into 26 Ramsay Street. In an interview, Chan revealed that she was unaware of Sadie's connection to Andrew and Wendy until the end of her first storyline. Chan was later added to the opening titles. Script producer Shane Isheev revealed that Sadie was planned to have siblings, however the serial's cancellation prevented them from being introduced. Sadie appears in the final episode of Neighbours on 28 July 2022.

At Erinsborough High, Sadie is introduced to Zara Selwyn by teacher Jane Harris (Annie Jones on her first day, along with her best friend, Aubrey Laing. Sadie and Aubrey quickly ditch Zara, but add her on social media after she sets off the school's fire alarm. They later ask her to join them for coffee and apologise for ditching her. Sadie and Aubrey pick up Zara from her house and notice that she lives near Hendrix Greyson (Ben Turland), who they both have crushes on. Zara tells them they work together and are friends, and Sadie and Aubrey are surprised when Zara later convinces Hendrix to play frisbee with them. After watching Jane scold Zara for not handing in her homework, Sadie and Aubrey pull a prank on Jane, which Zara gets the blame for. Zara continuously tells Sadie and Aubrey that Hendrix is into her, but they doubt her story as he has a girlfriend, so they ask her to prove it. She sends them photos of a text seemingly from Hendrix declaring his love and an engraved pendent he gave her. The following day, the girls tell Zara that a bin was set on fire at the school and they ask Zara if she did it, but she tells them she was not even on school grounds. Zara wonders if Sadie and Aubrey started the fire to get back at Jane again, but they deny it. Zara learns that Sadie has been given her old job at the café and that she and Aubrey know about the fire outside Jane's house. Zara apologises for accusing them of starting the bin fire, which they accept. 

When Sadie and Aubrey see Hendrix leaving Zara's house, and learn she is not moving back to Cairns, they send his girlfriend Mackenzie Hargreaves (Georgie Stone) the link to their private group chat about him. When Zara confronts them and discloses that she will be sent back to Cairns now, Sadie is relieved that their plan to start another fire in the school will not have to go ahead; Aubrey, however, insists on continuing. Sadie feels guilty after the fire spreads and Mackenzie is injured, with Zara taking the blame. Hendrix questions Sadie about Zara and the fire, but they are interrupted by Aubrey. He later overhears them talking and eventually Sadie admits that Aubrey started the fire and made her go along with it. Sadie goes to the police to confess and later apologises to Zara when they come face to face. Two months later, Sadie moves into Ramsay Street with her parents, but is nervous about encountering Zara and Hendrix again. Although Zara makes peace with her, they both learn that Hendrix requires a lung transplant following the events of the fire. Sadie is determined to move away again, but the family cannot afford to. Susan (Jackie Woodburne) and Karl Kennedy (Alan Fletcher) visit the family to help manage the situation, but tell Sadie that Hendrix is not yet ready to hear her apology. However, after overhearing her talking to Wendy, Hendrix encourages her to stop blaming herself for his health difficulties. Sadie and her family are invited to Hendrix's wedding, but Sadie begins to feel heavy guilt when Hendrix dies a few days later from his lung transplant surgery complications. To try and do some right, Sadie and Zara go to a shack where Corey Smythe-Jones (Laurence Boxhall) is hiding out. Corey knocks Sadie unconscious and kidnaps Zara, before Andrew and Levi Canning (Richie Morris) find Sadie and take her to hospital, where she recovers. Sadie and her family attend Toadie Rebecchi (Ryan Moloney) and Melanie Pearson's (Lucinda Cowden) wedding a few days later, then follows her neighbours back to Ramsay Street for their reception.

Kiri Durant

Kiri Durant, played by Gemma Bird Matheson, will make her first appearance on 24 March 2022 in Australia and on 9 March 2022 in the UK. The character and Matheson's introduction to the regular cast were announced on 7 February 2022. Matheson previously appeared in the show in 2016 as Carla Watson. She stated that she was "honoured" to join the show, adding that she was "excited by what this representation would mean for a lot of people, especially on such a mainstream show. I'm a big advocate for queer people playing queer roles. I'm excited about this representation for several reasons – I get to play myself, a queer Papua New Guinean Christian. That's pretty monumental." Kiri was billed as being "mysterious and flirty", "very morally-driven", but also "a good girl at heart". Matheson stated that her character would end up "in the middle of a lot of drama." Kiri is a love interest for Nicolette Stone (Charlotte Chimes), who meets her during a holiday to River Bend. Nicolette is "enamoured with the charming Kiri" and the pair share a kiss as they get to know one another. It was later confirmed that Kiri is Glen Donnelly's (Richard Huggett) long-lost daughter. Chloe Brennan (April Rose Pengilly) also becomes her second love interest as she moves onto Ramsay Street. Kiri also appears in the serial's final episode on 28 July 2022.

Kiri welcomes competition winner Glen Donnelly and his group of friends to the River Bend Getaway. She shows them their accommodation and invites them to give up their phones. Kiri flirts with Nicolette Stone, who reciprocates. She tells her that her parents own River Bend, but they moved up the coast and left her in charge. The following day, Kiri and Nicolette share a kiss which is interrupted by Glen. Kiri asks Glen if he has been to River Bend before as he looks familiar, and he tells her that he has been in the area before. Kiri overhears Harlow Robinson (Jemma Donovan) talking about someone named Isla and Nicolette admits that she has a daughter. She later visits Kiri's room to explain that she just wanted to be someone else for a few days. Kiri accepts her explanation and tells Nicolette that she has been thinking about her all afternoon. They spend the night together. In the morning, Kiri arranges a hike with Nicolette and Glen, but Ned Willis (Ben Hall) and Harlow return to tell them they heard gun shots nearby. Kiri presumes it is rabbit hunters, so she tells her employee Bobby Long (Ben Crundwell) to go with Nicolette to get the minibus and call the police from the office, while she and Glen look for Freya Wozniak (Phoebe Roberts) and Levi Canning (Richie Morris). They come across a motorbike in the bush and return to the base, where Nicolette tells them the minibus was gone and Bobby has gone to call the police. All members of the group are eventually found and return home. Kiri later turns up on Glen's doorstep and tells him that she has been worried about everyone and wanted to check in. She also tells him that she has come to see Nicolette, and Glen encourages her to go for it. Kiri asks Nicolette and asks her out on a date. Over lunch, Kiri explains that her parents have decided to sell River Bend and she is thinking of a change too. Glen later tells Kiri that if she is planning on staying in Erinsborough for Nicolette, then she needs to know that Nicolette is a user and a liar. Kiri then confronts Nicolette about giving Aaron Brennan (Matt Wilson) and David Tanaka (Takaya Honda) someone else's baby. She points out that it is not the first thing Nicolette has kept from her and that she is not about drama. The following day, Glen invites both Kiri and Nicolette to lunch for a chance to clear the air between them. When he admits to Nicolette that he told Kiri about her past, she pushes him into a pool. Kiri is shocked by her reaction and leaves. She checks on Glen and he says he should have kept out of it, but she thanks him for looking out for her. 

A week later, Kiri turns up at the vineyard where Glen works having been hired by Leo Tanaka (Tim Kano) as the new events manager. She befriends Chloe Brennan, who helps show her around the vineyard, and later joins her and her housemates, Freya and Mackenzie Hargreaves (Georgie Stone) for drinks. Chloe then invites Kiri to move in with them, but Kiri soon learns that she will be living on the same street as Nicolette, who used to date Chloe. Kiri visits the house and Chloe explains her part in the baby-swap and points out some of Nicolette's good qualities. Kiri admits that she likes everyone and the room, so she agrees to move in. She also arranges to carpool to the vineyard with Glen. During a trip to the beach with some of the other Ramsay Street residents, Kiri reassures Nicolette that things are good between and she wants to be friends. She later tells Glen that she has feelings for Chloe, but it is awkward as they now live together. When she notices Chloe is stressed due to work, Kiri teaches her some meditation techniques and they nearly kiss. They acknowledge there is something between them, but agree to just be friends so things do not become awkward in the house. Nicolette gets suspicious of Glen's attachment to Kiri, so she teams up with Paul Robinson (Stefan Dennis) and speaks to Karen Constantine (Amanda LaBonte). Through John Wong (Harry Tseng), Paul discovers that Kiri is Glen's daughter and reveals the news to her in front of Glen. Kiri speaks to her mother, Barbara Durant (Wendy Mocke), who admits that it is true, before Kiri tells Glen she wants nothing to do with him. Kiri later finds out that Terese Willis (Rebekah Elmaloglou) has accidentally informed Alan Durant, who is actually not Kiri's biological father, which Kiri believed he was.

Montana Marcel

Montana Marcel, played by Tammin Sursok, made her first appearance on 13 April 2022 in Australia and on 24 March 2022 in the UK. Sursok's casting was announced on 17 January 2022, but details of her character were not immediately revealed. Sursok secured the role after returning to Australia with her family. She admitted that she had previously told herself that she would not return to soap operas, following her stint in Home and Away as Dani Sutherland, saying "You know, I always said I'd never come back into soaps. It's not because I don't love it or it wasn't a great experience. It's because I felt like this chapter of my life was over." Sursok's guest appearance coincided with the announcement that Neighbours would be ending that year, and she praised the cast and crew for their positive attitudes on set. It was later announced that Sursok would be playing Montana Marcel, a fashion designer and businesswoman, who, along with her assistant Mick Allsop (Joel Creasey), takes out a tender from Lassiters Hotel for her Fashion Week. After hotel manager Terese Willis (Rebekah Elmaloglou) and Chloe Brennan (April Rose Pengilly) fail to impress Montana with their pitch, they ask Leo Tanaka (Tim Kano) to help save the Fashion Week tender and it soon becomes clear Montana "has taken a liking to him."

Montana visits Lassiters Hotel with her assistant Mick Allsop to hear Terese Willis and Chloe Brennan's pitch for her Fashion Week event. She is unimpressed by the complex and notes the tiki torches, before going to The Waterhole, where she asks Terese about the storm which led to the closure of the Flamingo Bar. Chloe says that Lassiters was not at fault for that, while Terese mentions the other high-profile events Lassiters has hosted. Montana then notices the gladioli flowers on the tables and says she is no longer hungry. The group visit Leo Tanaka's winery, where Terese and Chloe are hoping to host the fashion parade. Montana appears bored until she meets Leo. She eventually asks Terese and Chloe why she is being tortured with tiki torches, gladioli and ice sculptures. When Chloe explains that they thought everything reminded her of the things she loved, Montana says that they just remind her of being jilted by her fiancé at their wedding in Hawaii. Montana tells them she has seen enough, despite not hearing Terese's pitch, but Leo convinces her to stay and take a tour of the vineyard with him. Although she enjoys the tour with Leo, Montana tells Terese and Chloe that she is not interested in collaborating with Lassiters. Leo visits Montana at her home to ask for a second chance for Lassiters, but she admits she has concerns about the bad publicity the hotel has received. Leo says that her Fashion Week could be good for his business too. They talk about their time in New York and Leo's daughter, until Mick interrupts. Montana tells him to leave and lets him know she is aware that he sabotaged the Lassiters pitch. Montana offers to give Terese the tender if Leo has sex with her. He admits that he finds her attractive, but asks to think about it. Montana later awards the tender to Lassiters and she and Leo have sex again, after which he tries to talk her around to some of Chloe and Terese's ideas. She lets them know she is onto their plan to use Leo as their bargaining chip and that it will not work.

Corey Smythe-Jones

Corey Smythe-Jones, played by Laurence Boxhall, made his first appearance on 18 April 2022 in Australia and 28 March 2022 in the UK. Boxhall's casting was announced on 21 March 2022 by Jess Lee of Digital Spy. Corey is introduced as a potential love interest for Harlow Robinson (Jemma Donnovan). Corey and Harlow meet during a storyline set and filmed in the UK. Corey was initially billed as a "charismatic stranger." Following fan theories, Neighbours confirmed that Corey was the show's latest villain, who is attempting to recruit Harlow into The Restoration Order, a cult that Harlow's late mother, Prue Wallace (Denise van Outen), was a member of. Daniel Kilkelly of Digital Spy described Corey as acting "cunningly" and having "sinister intentions."

Corey helps fellow Everleigh Hotel guest Harlow Robinson with her luggage. Corey learns she is visiting from Australia and he asks her if she wants to join him for breakfast, but Harlow turns him down as she has to meet someone. Corey later meets Harlow at the hotel bar and learns she had a bad day, so he buys her a drink and they swap stories. Harlow meets with Corey the following afternoon to discuss her mother's diary, which is of interest to a cult that ruined the relationship between Harlow and her mother. Corey suggests Harlow burns the diary, but later apologises for making a radical proposal, however, Harlow thinks that it makes sense. When Corey asks if The Order will try to get the diary again, Harlow decides to go through with burning it. Corey fetches some matches and suggests they could find another way to keep the diary from The Order, but Harlow tells him that she has saved her favourite pages and then sets the diary on fire. Later that day, Corey and Harlow catch up and she tells him that things went well with her aunt. Corey asks Harlow whether something romantic might have happened between if she was not returning to Australia so soon. Harlow tells him that if circumstance were different, but she has some things to sort out back home first and it would be unfair to start something. Corey says that he has enjoyed the last few days with her.

Shortly after Harlow returns to Australia, Corey turns up in Erinsborough to surprise Harlow, after coming over for business. He meets Ned Willis (Ben Hall), Harlow's other love interest, and the rest of her family, before being invited to a farewell party for Roxy Willis (Zima Anderson) and Kyle Canning (Chris Milligan), where Harlow kisses him. They later attend a promotional event at Lassiters and a neighbourhood party together. Ned's girlfriend, Amy Greenwood (Jacinta Stapleton), asks if they would be her models for the upcoming Fashion Week and Corey agrees straight away. He later finds Harlow outside and she tells him that Amy and Ned are thinking of having a child together. Corey realises that there is something between her and Ned, but Harlow explains that there was something briefly and she apologises for lying to him. She says she likes him, but her feelings for Ned have not gone away yet. Corey accepts this and tells her they can take their relationship at her pace, but Harlow later says that she cannot be with him. Corey calls Christabel Bancroft (Syd Zygier) to tell her that Harlow broke up with him and that they need to figure out a new plan. He meets with Christabel, who tells him to exploit Harlow's vulnerability to bring her into The Order. He later hands over a USB stick owned by Harlow's mother, the key to which he retrieved from the burnt diary. He also tells her about a plan to play hero after revealing Harlow's affair with Ned.

Harriet Wallace

Harriet Wallace, played by Amanda Holden, made her first appearance on 18 April 2022 in Australia and on 28 March 2022 in the UK. The character and Holden's casting details were announced on 7 October 2021. Holden appears in scenes set in London, alongside Jemma Donovan. She began filming in the city during the week commencing 11 October 2021. Reacting to her casting, Holden said that she grew up watching Neighbours and stated "To now have the opportunity to be a part of such an iconic Australian show is simply fabulous. I can't wait to work with Jemma in London. This feels like a joyous occasion for everyone." Holden's character is Harlow Robinson's (Donovan) aunt and Prue Wallace's (Denise van Outen) sister. The show's executive producer, Jason Herbison, said Harriet and Harlow would be reunited as part of a big storyline in which they "solve a family mystery relating to Prue." Donovan added that she was looking forward to creating a relationship between the two characters.

Harriet meets her niece, Harlow Robinson at the South Bank and thinks she seems sad or heartbroken, but Harlow puts it down to jet lag. Harriet then tells Harlow that she has cleared her work schedule for the week, and Harlow produces her mother's diary, which she and Harriet plan to relive. After seeing some London sights, Harlow confides in Harriet about her fling with Ned Willis (Ben Hall), but quickly changes the subject back to Harriet, who apologises for not having her stay as she is renovating. They read events from Prue's diary and Harlow tells her about a stranger she met at her hotel. Harriet realises the diary is missing and they split up to try and find it. They are unsuccessful and make plans to meet up in the morning, as Harlow is tired. The following day, Harriet sees Harlow on her street and hurries away from her, but she drops her handbag as Harlow catches up to her and Prue's diary falls out. She explains that she hid the diary and then went back for it, after Harlow left. A woman from The Restoration Order, a cult Prue was involved in, offered Harriet £10,000 for the diary and she needs the money because she has lost her job and her partner has left her. She gives the diary back to Harlow, who later tells her that she has burnt the diary. Harriet cannot believe she was so desperate, but explains that when her life came crashing down, she felt that she lost herself and was unable to admit that she could no longer handle everything. Harlow then produces a bottle of wine and some cups, and Harriet ponders a move to Australia, but realises she needs to fix things at home first. Harlow offers her some money, but Harriet refuses and says she will be fine.

Asher Nesmith

Asher Nesmith, played by Kathleen Ebbs, made their first appearance on 10 May 2022 in Australia and on 14 April 2022 in the UK. Asher is the first non-binary character to appear in Neighbours. Before their first episode aired in Australia, Ebbs confirmed their casting and wrote about how much the part meant to them, saying "As someone who grew up watching this iconic soap, it was an honour to not only be a part of this amazing cast, but to be that representation I so desperately needed as kid. I hope I've done my community proud and you enjoy Asher as much as I enjoyed playing them. Here for a good time, not a long time!" Ebbs found the cast and crew were open to feedback about how Asher should be portrayed and gave them "flexibility" to change things, like Asher's outfits to make them feel comfortable. Ebbs found their time on set to be a "positive experience", as well as an "euphoric experience" as they were the first non-binary person on the show. Iona Rowan of Digital Spy speculated that Asher might end up working at the local café, after an official photograph featuring Ebbs on the set was released by the show. At the end of May, it was confirmed Asher would become a love interest for Nicolette Stone (Charlotte Chimes).

Asher visits The Waterhole and comments on the clothing brand that Nicolette Stone's daughter is wearing. After Nicolette leaves to change a nappy, her mother Jane Harris (Annie Jones) notices a rainbow patch on Asher's bag and asks if it means gay pride or if it is just a rainbow. She then explains that Nicolette is a lesbian and she is a teacher who is always learning from her students. Asher tells her that they are queer and non-binary. Jane later tells Nicolette that Asher is single and has a young son. Weeks later, Jane invites Asher to be Nicolette's date at Hendrix Greyson (Ben Turland) and Mackenzie Hargreaves' (Georgie Stone) wedding reception. Asher says they would never have agreed to come if they did not think Nicolette was in on it, but they both admit Jane can be very persuasive. Asher and Nicolette party with Chloe Brennan (April Rose Pengilly) and Kiri Durant (Gemma Bird Matheson), before Asher initiates a kiss with Nicolette on the dancefloor. Nicolette invites Asher to a local queer bar for their second date, but Asher texts to say that her babysitter has let them down, leaving Nicolette alone with Jane. Asher eventually turns up and is surprised to see Nicolette still at the bar, as they assumed she would have left. Asher tells Nicolette that as the babysitter turned up, they thought they would go out anyway. Asher invites Nicolette to play a game of pool, but Nicolette does not want them to see her competitive side, so Asher decides to ask Jane, who tells them about a new friend she has met. Both Asher and Nicolette realise that Jane's friend fancies her. Asher visits Nicolette at work the following day to ask her to lunch, but they realise Nicolette is making excuses not to go and Nicolette eventually tells them that she not interested in dating them and Asher leaves.

Sian Caton

Sian Caton, played by Esther Anderson, made her first appearance on 6 June 2022 in Australia and on 5 May 2022 in the UK. Anderson announced her casting on 9 March 2022 with a social media post stating "Thanks for the warm welcome @neighbours. Happy I get to play a little part in this iconic show!!" Details about her guest role were released on 24 April. Dr Sian Caton is introduced as part of a major storyline for Hendrix Greyson (Benny Turland), who visits Erinsborough Hospital as a precaution after suffering from a coughing fit. However, Dr Caton informs him that he has a life-threatening lung condition called pulmonary fibrosis and needs to undergo a lung transplant.

Hendrix Greyson books an appointment at Erinsborough Hospital for a check-up, after suffering several coughing fits. Dr Caton calls Hendrix to tell him that his test results have come through, and she informs him that he has sarcoidosis, an autoimmune disease. She shows Hendrix x-rays of his lungs and where the disease is affecting them. Dr Caton explains that sarcoidosis is usually treatable, but it has developed into pulmonary fibrosis. Hendrix asks what treatment there is for it, but Dr Caton says there is no medication for pulmonary fibrosis and Hendrix's only option is a lung transplant. Weeks later, Dr Caton carries out Hendrix's lung transplant and the surgery goes well. However, shortly after Hendrix comes around, he starts coughing and struggling to breathe. Dr Caton checks him over and then tells her colleague Karl Kennedy (Alan Fletcher) that Hendrix's body is rejecting the new lungs. He suggests that he informs the family and Dr Caton agrees that it would be easier coming from someone they know. Dr Caton tells them that Karl will explain what is going on, and that Hendrix has asked for his wife Mackenzie Hargreaves (Georgie Stone) to be with him. Dr Caton explains to Mackenzie that Hendrix is suffering from hyperacute rejection and that the anti-rejection drugs are not working due to Hendrix's antibodies overriding them. She then tells them that the new lungs have suffered irreparable damage and Hendrix only has a few hours. She later asks if Hendrix or Mackenzie have any questions, and then says that they will make sure Hendrix is comfortable. Hendrix tells her that he does not want to be sedated as he wants to make the most of the time he has left.

Alana Greyson

Alana Greyson, played by Molly Broadstock, made her first appearance on 16 June 2022 in Australia and 20 May in the UK. Daniel Kilkelly of Digital Spy confirmed Broadstock's casting on 10 May 2022. Alana is the younger sister of Hendrix Greyson (Ben Turland), and the daughter of Pierce Greyson (Tim Robards) and Lisa Rowsthorn (Jane Allsop). The character has been previously mentioned on-screen since Hendrix's arrival in 2019, and will be introduced after Hendrix is diagnosed with pulmonary fibrosis. She makes her debut in a special episode written by the show's executive producer Jason Herbison, which is set and filmed entirely in Sydney, and focuses entirely on Hendrix's storyline. In the episode, Hendrix reveals his illness to his family after Alana notices his unusual behaviour. Of the siblings' relationship, Turland told Kilkelly, "Molly has been great. Finding the love between a brother and sister has been really fun to explore. We'll see how Hendrix acts as a big brother. He feels quite guilty that he hasn't been there for his sister. It's been really good and Molly is great. We connected and established this sibling relationship, especially as we see the two characters in their homes in Sydney."

Alana finds her brother Hendrix and his girlfriend Mackenzie Hargreaves (Georgie Stone) in central Sydney, after tracking them through his social media posts. The group then visit Alana and Hendrix's father Pierce Greyson (Tim Robards) at his home for lunch. Hendrix starts to feel ill, but he blames it on their early start, although Alana is suspicious. She later goes through Hendrix's belongings and finds information about pulmonary fibrosis, which she shares with their parents. She tells Hendrix that she was worried about him. Hendrix then tells his family that he has an autoimmune disease that developed into pulmonary fibrosis, after he rescued Mackenzie from a fire. Alana asks him what happened during lunch and Hendrix tells them his medication makes him queasy. Alana blames Mackenzie for Hendrix's condition and he orders her to apologise, saying it is no one's fault. The following morning, Hendrix and Mackenzie announce that they are engaged, but Alana runs off instead of congratulating them. Hendrix finds her and asks if it is because she does not like Mackenzie, but Alana says no. Hendrix reassures her that although he is flying back to Erinsborough, he is not going anywhere yet. Alana then makes a joke about Mackenzie being way out of his league and the pair hug. Alana apologises to Mackenzie, who accepts and explains that she has also let her anger get the better of her. Before they leave, Hendrix tells Alana to visit soon. Alana attends their wedding and is devastated when Hendrix's operation results in his death a few days later. She says her goodbyes at his funeral.

Estelle Petrides

Estelle Petrides, played by Maria Mercedes, made her first appearance on 21 June 2022 in Australia and 27 May in the UK. The character and Mercedes' casting was announced on 15 May 2022. Mercedes previously appeared in the serial as Lucia Cammeniti. Estelle is Terese Willis' (Rebekah Elmaloglou) estranged mother, and her introduction helps further exploration of Terese's fictional backstory. Estelle initially claims she has come to support her daughter through her divorce from Paul Robinson (Stefan Dennis), but Terese soon learns from her brother Nick Petrides (Damien Fotiou) that Estelle is homeless. Terese decides she wants to repair her relationship with her mother, but struggles to trust her. Elmaloglou confirmed that producers had planned to introduce Terese's mother for years and that her behaviour would help viewers understand why Terese has become "so hard." Elmaloglou described Estelle as "one of those flamboyant, outrageous types who can't help herself". She told Jonathon Hughes of Inside Soap that Terese and Estelle became estranged after Estelle flirted with Terese's former husband Brad Willis (Kip Gamblin). As it was not the first time Estelle had made advances towards Terese's partners, she ordered her to stay away. Elmaloglou compared the pair to Eddie and Saffy from Absolutely Fabulous, as their mother-daughter roles are reversed. She thought Estelle had never grown up.

Estelle has a drink in The Waterhole and befriends Wendy Rodwell (Candice Leask), then encourages her to speak up for what she stands for. Estelle then surprises her daughter, Terese Willis, at her house. Estelle moves in and explains to Terese that she wishes to mend their relationship. Terese questions why Estelle was not there to support her during tough times in the past and Estelle explains that she lived up to her promise of staying away. Estelle continuously calls Terese "agapi mou" (meaning "my love"), despite Terese's discomfort with the phrase. Terese discovers that Estelle has become homeless following her break-up with her boyfriend, and Estelle later has drinks with Terese's husband, Paul Robinson, who Terese is divorcing. When Estelle is caught with Paul once more, she explains to Terese that she was trying to find more information on their divorce settlements. Later, Estelle and Terese bond over Josh Willis (Harley Bonner), before they vow to mend their relationship and avoid Paul. However, Estelle eventually meets up with Paul once more in his penthouse. Paul's brother and Terese's partner, Glen Donnelly (Richard Huggett), pretends Terese has made an investment, which Estelle immediately tells Paul about. Terese then kicks Estelle out of her house and Paul offers her a room at Lassiters, so Estelle kisses Paul to his surprise. Estelle looks at Paul's business files and is caught, then is kicked out of the hotel. She then asks for Terese's forgiveness and pledges to find a job and live with Terese long-term. Terese accepts, but soon discovers that she is wearing a bracelet Paul gave her, so kicks her out again. Estelle later runs off from The 82 without paying for her coffee, however Glen pays for it and talks with Estelle, then allows her to stay in a spare room at Baker's Hill Winery, where she drinks the wine and discovers Glen's drug addiction. Estelle threatens to expose Glen's addiction if he does not help her get back on Terese's good side. Glen convinces Terese to talk to Estelle and they sort out their differences, then Estelle moves back into Terese's home. When Glen tells Terese the truth about his addiction and Estelle's blackmail, Terese gives Estelle a large amount of money and makes her choose between the money and her. Estelle chooses the money and tells Terese it will be life-changing for her. She suggests in the future they can reconcile again, but Terese tells her that is not the way it will work. Estelle says goodbye to her daughter and leaves.

Sam Young

Sam Young, played by Henrietta Graham, made her first appearance on 29 June 2022 in Australia and 9 June 2022 in the UK. The character and Graham's casting was announced on 11 May 2022 via the show's social media, and later confirmed by Rianne Hougton of Digital Spy. Graham's casting came about after she stated that she wanted to appear in Neighbours during an interview with The Age in December 2021. The interview was seen by Fremantle publicist Kelly Davis, who then showed it to show producer Andrew Thompson and they invited Graham to the set. She then auditioned for the role and was cast in April 2022, making her one of the last characters to be introduced before production wrapped in June. Of her casting, Graham commented "I can't believe I'm in my favourite show." She expressed her delight at securing the role and getting to work with her favourite actors. Thompson said casting Graham, who has Down syndrome, was "an opportunity to promote inclusivity on screen". He also revealed that her character is not a one-off guest part and would become part of the "community". Sam is Chloe Brennan's (April Rose Pengilly) new assistant at Lassiters Hotel. Her arrival occurs during a period of strife for Lassiters, as its staff are facing the consequences of the recently failed Lassiters Fashion Week, which resulted in the general manager being fired. The character was originally announced as Sam Ellis, but was later revealed to be the daughter of Mike Young (Guy Pearce), who returned for the series' final episodes. Pearce is a family friend of Graham's, and requested to work with her as part of his appearance. He also suggested that Sam could be Mike's daughter. Graham's character was named after a "well-known" Neighbours fan and Sam's mother was named after Kate Winslet's Titanic character, Rose.

Sam is greeted by her new boss Chloe Brennan on her first day at Lassiters, and is told to head inside ready for her induction. A few days later, Chloe thanks Sam for a report and tells her they can do a maintenance check in the conference room if she is up for it. Sam checks that Chloe is okay following the recent death of her stepson. Sam receives help from the hotel's former manager, Terese Willis (Rebekah Elmaloglou), while doing jobs for the owner, Paul Robinson (Stefan Dennis). She hides the fact that Terese is helping with hotel work from Wendy Rodwell (Candice Leask) and Paul, who congratulates Sam for doing her job well. Sam later asks Chloe how she feels about Lassiters upon hearing that Paul may be buying Terese out of the business. Sam visits Chloe once she learns that she is selling her house and resigning from Lassiter's. Chloe also tells Sam that she has requested the new owner of Lassiter's keeps Sam employed. When Mike Young returns to Erinsborough, it is revealed that Sam is his daughter. Sam has drinks with Mike and his old friends and they decide to visit Ramsay Street. Sam later visits Ramsay Street with her father, and encourages him to rekindle his relationship with Jane Harris (Annie Jones). She is enthused at the prospect of Mike buying 24 Ramsay Street.

Byron Stone

Byron Stone, played by Joe Klocek, made his first appearance on 11 July 2022 in Australia and on 24 June 2022 in the UK. Klocek's casting details were announced on 12 June 2022 via Digital Spy. He previously guested in the serial as Evan Lewis in 2017. The character is the son of Jane Harris and brother of Nicolette Stone (Charlotte Chimes). He turns up unannounced at Jane's home, where she and Aaron Brennan (Matt Wilson) are "stunned" to find him using their pool. Jane is glad to have Byron back in her life, as he has been away travelling. Byron was billed as "Jane's golden child" and a "charming newcomer". Script producer Shane Isheev revealed that the serial's cancellation prevented Byron from becoming a regular character, which was the original intention, however producers still wanted viewers to see the character on screen. Isheev told Joe Julians of Digital Spy, "He is a character that we would have got a lot of mileage out of, and he would have stuck around long-term." Byron made his final appearance on 26 July 2022.

Jane Harris and her housemate, Aaron Brennan (Matt Wilson), spot Byron swimming in their pool, but are unaware of who he is. When Aaron yells at Byron, Jane realises he is her son and greets him along with his sister Nicolette Stone. Byron tells them that he tried using the front door, but there was no answer, so he went for a swim. Byron is shy to hold his niece, Isla Tanaka-Brennan (Mary Finn), and explains that he is moving to Erinsborough, before declining Jane's offer of moving in with them. Byron also explains that he has finished his law degree and Jane suggests he asks Toadie Rebecchi (Ryan Moloney) for a job. Byron meets Terese Willis (Rebekah Elmaloglou) and Toadie and overhears them talking about Sapiko and Bas Holdings, a company Terese's ex-husband is investing their divorce money into. Byron tells them that people use the company as a way to put their money into secret trust accounts. Toadie then offers Byron a job as a junior associate at his law firm. Byron meets with Danielle Pendlebury (Christine Stephen-Daly), who has employed him as her escort, and Byron says that no one else can know of his work. Byron then has sex with Danielle to ensure she will not tell anyone. While spending time with Danielle, Byron listens to her speaking to her boyfriend on the phone and Byron realises she is secretly dating Jane's partner, Clive Gibbons (Geoff Paine), after meeting him and recognising his voice.

Byron organises a date with Amy Greenwood (Jacinta Stapleton), but when he sees Nicolette with her, he cancels. He later tells Nicolette that he thinks Clive is having an affair and reveals that he is an escort. Byron looks for more evidence of Clive's affair and finds his phone number in Danielle's phone, however, Danielle catches him going through her things and fires him. Nicolette later visits Danielle's house and takes a photo of her touching Clive's face, before she and Byron tell Jane they think Clive is having an affair. When Byron tells her he found out through his job as an escort, a picture of Mrs Mangel (Vivean Gray) falls to the ground. After Jane breaks up with Clive, she forces Byron between her two jobs and Byron chooses escorting. Byron gets notified of a client requesting his services in Cape Town, so he says goodbye to his family and Jane apologises for treating him harshly. She explains that it was not her intention to kick him out and Byron tells her to take advantage of her time now that she is no longer dating. Later, Byron and Jane give their goodbyes and Byron leaves.

Others

References

External links
 Characters and cast at the Official Neighbours website

2022
2022 in Australian television
, Neighbours